Dick Brown may refer to:

 Dick Brown (rugby league), rugby league player in Australia
 Dick Brown (baseball) (1935–1970), catcher in American Major League Baseball
 Dick Brown (curler), American curler
 Dick Brown (Canadian football) (1926–2000), Canadian football player
 Dick Brown (footballer) (1911–1985), English footballer
 Dick Brown (politician) (1887–1971), member of the Queensland Legislative Assembly
 Dick Charles Brown (1905–1969), Cook Islands businessman and politician

See also
 Richard Brown (disambiguation)